La Pila is a village in Tuscany, central Italy, administratively a frazione of the comune of Campo nell'Elba, province of Livorno. At the time of the 2011 census its population was 405.

La Pila is located on the Elba Island and it is about 3 km from the municipal seat of Marina di Campo.

Airport 
 Marina di Campo Airport

Bibliography 
 

Frazioni of Campo nell'Elba